A listing of health care professions by
medical discipline.

Anesthesiology
 Anesthesiologist
 Anesthesiology Fellow
 Certified Registered Nurse Anesthetist
 Registered Respiratory Therapist
 Anesthesiologist Assistant

Cardiovascular medicine
 Cardiologist
 Cardiology Fellow
 Cardiology Physician Assistant
 Cardiac Scientist
 Cardiovascular Technologist

Critical care medicine
 Intensivist
 Neonatologist
 Critical Care Medicine Physician Assistant
 Critical Care Nurse Practitioner
 Critical Care Registered Nurse
 Critical Care Respiratory Therapist

Dentistry
Dentist
Dental Hygienist
Dental Assistant
Dental Technician

Dermatology
 Dermatologist
 Dermatology Physician Assistant

Dietetics
 Dietitian

Emergency medicine
 Emergency physician
 Emergency Physician Assistant
 Emergency Nurse Practitioner
 Flight Nurse
 Certified Emergency Registered Nurse
 Certified Emergency Registered Respiratory Therapist
 Emergency Medical Technician - Critical Care Paramedic
 Emergency Medical Technician - Paramedic
 Emergency Medical Technician - Intermediate 99
 Emergency Medical Technician - Intermediate 85
 Emergency Medical Technician - Basic

Endocrinology
 Endocrinologist
 Endocrinology Physician Assistant

Gastroenterology
 Gastroenterologist
 Gastroenterology Physician Assistant

Genetics
 Genetic Counselor/Counsellor

Geriatric medicine
 Geriatrician
 Geriatric Medicine Physician Assistant
 Gerontological Nurse Practitioner
Occupational Therapist

Haematology
 Haematologist
 Haematology Physician Assistant
 Medical Laboratory Technician
 Phlebotomist

Nephrology
 Nephrologist
 Nephrology Physician Assistant
 Dialysis Technician

Neurology
 Neurologist
 Neurology Physician assistant
Occupational Therapist
Speech Language Pathologist
 Audiologist
 Neuropsychologist

Oncology
 Oncologist
 Oncology Physician Assistant
 Radiation Therapist

Ophthalmology
 Ophthalmologist
 Eye Surgery

Optometry 

 Optometrist
 Occupational Therapist- Low Vision Rehab

Otorhinolaryngology 
 Otolaryngologist (Ear, Nose and Throat physician)
 Otorhinolaryngology Physician assistant

Pastoral care
 Healthcare Chaplain

Pathology
 Pathologist

Pulmonology (Respirology)
 Pulmonologist
 Pulmonology/Respirology Physician Assistant
 Registered Respiratory Therapist

Primary care medicine
 General practitioner
 Primary care physician
 Internist
 Physician assistant
 Family nurse practitioner
 Pharmacist
Community Health practitioner''''Pediatric medicine
 Neonatologist
 Pediatrician
 Pediatric Physician Assistant
 Neonatal Nurse Practitioner
 Pediatric Nurse Practitioner
 Occupational Therapist- Neonatal/ Pediatric
 Pediatric Nurse
 Pediatric Respiratory Therapist

Pharmacy
Pharmacist
Pharmacy technician

Podiatric medicine
 Podiatric Surgeon
 Doctor of Podiatric Medicine
 Podiatrist
 Chiropodist

Psychiatry
 Psychiatrist
 Psychiatry Physician Assistant
 Psychologist
 Psychiatric Nurse Practitioner
 Mental Health Nurse Practitioner
 Occupational Therapist
 Social Worker
 Mental Health Counselor

Public Health and Preventive Medicine
 Medical Officer of Health
 Environmental Health Officer
 Epidemiologist
 Public Health Nurse

Orthopedics, rheumatology, and movement
 Orthopedic Physician
 Orthopaedic Physician´s Assistant
 Sport Psychologist
 Physical Therapist
 Occupational Therapist
 Physical Therapy Assistant
 Occupational Therapy Assistant
 Orthopaedic Technologist or Prosthetist & Orthotist
 Chiropractor
 Biokineticist
 Athletic Trainer
Yoga Instructor
 Massage Therapist

Radiology
 Radiologist
 Radiology Physician Assistant
 Radiotherapist, also known as a Radiation Therapist or Therapeutic Radiographer Radiographer, also known as a Radiologic Technologist''
 CT Radiographer
 Interventional Radiographer
 Mammographer
 Neuroradiographer
 Medical Dosimetry Technologist
 Radiologist Practitioner Assistant
 Reporting Radiographer
 Sonographer

Reproductive medicine
 Obstetrician
 Gynaecologist
 OB/GYN Physician Assistant
 Women's Health Nurse Practitioner
 Nurse-Midwife
 Midwife
 Lactation consultant

Surgery
 General Doctor 
 Bariatric Surgeon
 Cardiothoracic surgeon
 Cardiac Surgeon
 Hepatic Biliary Pancreatic Surgeon
 Neurosurgeon
 Podiatric Surgeon
 Surgery Physician Assistant

Urology
 Urologist
 Urology Physician Assistant

External links

 
Lists of occupations
Occupations